Which Wich Superior Sandwiches is an American fast casual restaurant chain specializing in sandwiches and salads. It has its headquarters in Downtown Dallas, Texas. , it has 404 locations open in 36 U.S. states as well as the District of Columbia, along with 27 international locations in Great Britain, Bahrain, Guatemala, Kuwait, Mexico, Oman, Panama, Qatar, Saudi Arabia, and the United Arab Emirates.

History
Founded by restaurateur Jeff Sinelli, CEO of Genghis Grill, in 2003, Which Wich began with one location in downtown Dallas. It began franchising in 2005.

Business

Which Wich is known for its ordering system, in which customers use red Sharpie markers to mark up pre-printed menus on sandwich bags. They select a sandwich from 10 categories, then choose the bread, cheese, spreads, and toppings. There are other extra options such as double meat, double cheese, bacon, and avocado. The menus have a wide variety of options which besides the aforementioned extras are all free.  The sandwiches are then prepared, and delivered in the personalized sandwich bags. Guests are encouraged to draw on their bags and hang their "artwork" on the community wall.

Which Wich sells customizable submarine sandwiches it calls "Wiches". There are ten categories and 60 topping options. Sandwiches come in regular (7-inch), large (10.5-inch), super (14-inch), spinach wraps, and lettucewiches sizes.

Seasonal Wiches
Which Wich offers seasonal "wiches" that remain on the menu for around 3 months. If the  "limited" sandwich proves popular, then it could be incorporated into the main menu.

Growth
In 2007, the chain ranked as the fastest-growing restaurant chain concept with 50 operating stores or fewer, opening nine locations during a four-month period at the beginning of the year. In 2009, the chain ranked as the sixth-fastest-growing concept in the industry, according to restaurantchains.net.

In 2013, the chain opened locations in Mexico City, Panama City, and Dubai. In 2015, the chain opened three locations in Guatemala City.

In 2018, the chain opened its first location in the UK with a store in London.  At this time there was an expectation of opening ten additional stores throughout the UK by 2022, and growing to a total of 100 by 2028.

References

External links

Official Web Site

Restaurants in Dallas
Regional restaurant chains in the United States
Restaurants established in 2003
Fast casual restaurants
2003 establishments in Texas